Brentwood S. Tolan (November 23, 1855 – June 30, 1923) was an American architect. His most notable works include the National Historic Landmark-designated Allen County Courthouse in downtown Fort Wayne, Indiana, the Whitley County Courthouse in Columbia City, Indiana, the La Porte County Courthouse in La Porte, Indiana, as well as the now-demolished Old National Bank Building and Masonic Temple and Opera House in Fort Wayne.

Tolan was born in Delphos, Ohio to Thomas J. and Harriet Skinner Tolan. With little formal art training, he apprenticed under his father, a marble craftsman-turned architect, starting in 1872 at age 17. In 1874 his father moved the family and architectural practice to Fort Wayne, Indiana.

After his father's death in 1883, Tolan continued the family architectural practice in Fort Wayne. He became well known during the Progressive Era in the Great Lakes area of the Midwest for designing municipal and local government buildings, including courthouses and jails. He later moved to Lima, Ohio, where he practiced with the firm DeCurtin, Rawson, and Tolan. He is buried in Delphos.

National Register of Historic Places
T.J. Tolan & Son, Architects
Davis County Courthouse, Bloomfield, Iowa (added May 3, 1974)
Van Wert County Courthouse, Van Wert, Ohio (added July 30, 1974)
Holmes County Sheriff’s Residence and Jail, Millersburg, Ohio (added July 25, 1974)
Morrow County Sheriff’s Residence and Jail, Mount Gilead, Ohio (added July 25, 1974)
La Grange County Courthouse, Lagrange, Indiana (added July 17, 1980)
First United Methodist Church, Van Wert, Ohio (added 1982)
Noble County Sheriff’s Residence and Jail, Albion, Indiana (added December 27, 1982)
Kosciusko County Courthouse, Warsaw, Indiana (added March 1, 1982)
Parke County Courthouse, Rockville, Indiana (added May 27, 1993)
McCulloch-Weatherhogg Double House, Fort Wayne, Indiana (added 2001)
Henry County Courthouse, Cambridge, Illinois (added August 20, 2004)

Brentwood S. Tolan, Architect
Allen County Courthouse, Fort Wayne, Indiana (added May 28, 1976)
LaPorte County Courthouse, LaPorte, Indiana
Whitley County Courthouse, Columbia City, Indiana

Decurtin, Rawson, and Tolan
Argonne Hotel, Lima, Ohio (added October 7, 1982)

National Historic Landmark
Brentwood S. Tolan, Architect
Allen County Courthouse, Fort Wayne, Indiana (added July 31, 2003)

Images

External links
Whitley County Courthouse photo
Allen County Courthouse facts
La Porte County Historical Society site with courthouse pictures
Davis County Courthouse Preservation

1855 births
1923 deaths
Architects from Ohio
Architects from Fort Wayne, Indiana
People from Delphos, Ohio
People from Lima, Ohio